The Scroafa is a left tributary of the river Târnava Mare in Romania. It discharges into the Târnava Mare near Mureni.

References

Rivers of Mureș County
Rivers of Brașov County
Rivers of Romania